Martin Burns (February 15, 1861 – January 8, 1937), nicknamed Farmer Burns, was an American catch wrestler, wrestling coach, and teacher. Born in Cedar County, Iowa, he started wrestling as a teenager and made money traveling around the Midwest wrestling in carnivals and fairs. As a professional wrestler, he claimed the American Heavyweight Championship by defeating Evan "Strangler" Lewis in 1895 and held the title for two years, during the time when contests were legitimate. At this time, Martin Burns himself claimed to have wrestled in more than 6,000 matches and is said to have lost only seven. He died in Council Bluffs in 1937. In 2001 Martin "Farmer" Burns was inducted into the International Wrestling Institute and Museum Hall of Fame. He was also inducted into the Wrestling Observer Newsletter Hall of Fame in 2002. The Professional Wrestling Hall of Fame inducted Martin Burns in 2003 and Burns was inducted into the WWE Hall Of Fame in 2017.

Childhood
Martin Burns was born on February 15, 1861, in a log cabin on a farm in Cedar County, Iowa. Growing up amidst the Civil War, Burns was exposed at an early age to the sport of wrestling, which was a preferred activity among the soldiers while stationed in camp. Consequently, the sport's popularity further increased during the 1860s, and many historians also speculate that the added interest may be due to the fact that President Abraham Lincoln had himself been a wrestler in his younger years.

Burns wrestled impromptu matches as a child; and at age 8, he tossed an older rival to claim a fifteen cent prize. His father died when he was 11, leaving him to support his mother, brother, and five sisters. To earn money, Burns worked at a nearby farm for $12 per month; and while he received little schooling, it was this physical labor that enabled Burns to develop his tremendous physical strength. He also spent time working in grading camps, where he competed in regular competitions against rugged strongmen. However, while these men focused on brute strength, Burns spent much time meticulously perfecting the strategies and techniques of catch wrestling, which is a grappling style where various holds and tactics are used with the intent to either submit or pin both opponent's shoulders to the ground at once. Therefore, the combination of Burns’ superior conditioning, intellect, and advanced skill made him a nearly unbeatable wrestling opponent.

Early career
By 1880, Martin Burns had developed a formidable reputation; and at 19, he wrestled his first match against a professional grappler when he battled David Grafft to a 2-hour and 19 minute draw. He then honed his skills against the top pro wrestlers of the day, losing decisions to Henry Clayton and Tom Connors in 1886 and 1887 respectively. The defeat to Clayton particularly irked Burns, as he was unable to offset the feared stranglehold that subsequently earned Clayton the moniker Evan “Strangler” Lewis (long before the more famous Ed “Strangler” Lewis was ever born). Consequently, Burns launched into a rigorous program of neck development; and soon built an immense 20” neck that possessed such strength that he could be dropped six feet on a hangman's noose to no effect (a stunt that Burns would often perform at carnivals and fairs).

While on a trip to Chicago in the spring of 1889, Burns saw a sign offering $25 to anyone who could last fifteen minutes against top grapplers Jack Carleek and Evan Lewis. Burns accepted the challenge and showed up at the Olympic Theater dressed in his regular farmer's overalls. Consequently, the event's announcer introduced Martin to the crowd as “Farmer” Burns; and the “Farmer” promptly made a monkey out of Carleek, throwing him across the stage before being declared the winner after fifteen minutes. The next challenge was Burns’ much-awaited rematch against Evan “Strangler” Lewis, who was now the reigning Catch-as-Catch-Can Heavyweight Champion, having defeated Joe Acton on March 14, 1887. However, fifteen minutes proved not enough time for Lewis to throw Burns; and again, the unknown “Farmer” was declared the winner and was subsequently lauded as a wrestling hero the next day in Chicago newspapers.

American Champion
Following Farmer Burns’ emergence as a premier grappler, he traveled the country, taking on the greatest wrestlers of the day, while also beating all comers at carnivals. Though he weighed just 165 pounds, he regularly defeated men who outweighed him by as much as 50-100 pounds. At the time, professional catch-as-catch-can (freestyle) wrestling often used no time limit, and a match was usually decided when a wrestler “threw” his opponent to the ground. However, Burns became known as the master of the pinfall, as he perfected the art of trapping his opponents’ shoulders to the mat while contriving such dangerous maneuvers as the full and half-nelson, hammerlock, double-wrist lock, chicken wing, and a variety of submission toe holds.

Farmer Burns soon encountered the renowned Sorakichi Matsuda, who is regarded as Japan's first-ever pro wrestler, and who had been a top challenger to World Wrestling Champions William Muldoon and Ernest Roeber during the previous decade. The two faced off in Troy, NY on May 13, 1891, and Burns scored his biggest win yet when he pinned Matsuda in just four minutes. As a result, Farmer Burns soon became known as the world's premier all-around grappler; and between 1890 and 1893, he never lost a single fall. Then, on March 2, 1893, Evan Lewis was recognized as wrestling's American Heavyweight Champion when he beat Ernest Roeber to unify the American Greco-Roman Heavyweight Championship with the Catch-As-Catch-Can Championship. This set up yet another rematch between Farmer Burns and Strangler Lewis; and on April 20, 1895, Burns pinned Lewis to capture the title. Burns would go on to reign as wrestling's American Champion for two years until he was finally beaten by Dan McLeod and Tom Jenkins in 1897.

Retirement and Post-Career
Nevertheless, Farmer Burns’ greatest contribution to wrestling's evolution may be as a trainer. He opened a gymnasium in Rock Island, Illinois in 1893, and helped to establish schools that enlightened young grapplers to the world of catch wrestling. In 1899, Burns defeated a 21-year-old Iowan named Frank Gotch, but he recognized his raw talent and recruited him as his prized student. Burns would then mold Gotch into perhaps the greatest wrestling champion of all-time, as he defeated George Hackenschmidt in 1908 to claim the undisputed World Heavyweight Title. In addition, Farmer Burns also served as a teacher to a myriad of grapplers who would transform the sport in the early 1900s, including future World Champion Earl Caddock, future Middleweight World Champion and Champion Wrestler of the A.E.F. Ralph Parcaut, as well as creative pioneer Joseph “Toots” Mondt. Other big names he personally trained included Rudy Dusek, Joe Malcewicz, Emil Klank, Jess Westergaard, Fred Beell and Jack Sherry. It is said he trained more than 1,600 wrestlers in all. Burns was so respected as a trainer that he was even recruited to serve as the conditioning coach for boxer Jim Jeffries’ 1910 title bout against Jack Johnson.

In 1914, Burns published a 96-page mail-order course entitled The Lessons in Wrestling and Physical Culture, which incorporated breathing techniques, calisthenics, stamina exercises, and Eastern martial arts principles, thus becoming the bible for all aspiring wrestlers during the early 1900s. Moreover, it is said that Ed “Strangler” Lewis, the great wrestling champion of the 1920s and 30s (and the eventual teacher of Lou Thesz) got his start in wrestling by following Burns’ training methods. Consequently, it is because of Burns’ many efforts that his native state of Iowa has subsequently become the nation's amateur wrestling capital, with the University of Iowa consistently serving as an NCAA powerhouse, and with the International Wrestling Institute and Museum also based in Newton.

On March 31, 2017, Burns was posthumously inducted into the WWE Hall of Fame as a part of the Legacy wing.

Personal life
Burns had two sons, Raymond and Charlie, who became musicians in Chicago, and a daughter, Celia Burns Beem.  He suffered the loss of his wife Amelia in 1930, which led to the deterioration of his own condition. At this point he went to live with his daughter who died in 1951.

Death

Burns died on January 8, 1937, in Council Bluffs, Iowa at the age of 75, and was buried at the St. James Cemetery in Toronto, Iowa.

The "Farmer" Burns Workout
The "Farmer" Burns workout is a custom workout routine developed by Martin Burns for himself and his students. It is based only on resistance provided by one's own body, a pair of dumbbell weights, and supplemental aerobic exercise, such as running. The workout consists of three phases of exercises organized into sets and repetitions. The first phase is a combination of warm-ups and stretches, using only one's own body for resistance. The second phase uses a pair of dumbbells for resistance, otherwise resembling aerobics in appearance. The third phase of exercises are partner exercises, again only relying on the two persons' bodies for resistance.  Martin Burns' career success is often accredited greatly in part to this intense workout routine.

Feats of Strength
Burns was well known in the early twentieth century for his neck. He managed to have a twenty-inch neck. With this neck, according to an article in WWE Magazine, he gained fame by being put into a noose, getting hanged, and living, while whistling "Yankee Doodle".

Championships and accomplishments
 Catch wrestling
 World Catch-as-Catch-Can Championship (1 time)
 American Catch-as-Catch-can Championship (1 time)
 Iowa Sports Hall of Fame
Inducted by Des Moines Register in 1951

 George Tragos/Lou Thesz Professional Wrestling Hall of Fame
 Class of 2001
International Professional Wrestling Hall of Fame
Class of 2021
 Professional Wrestling Hall of FamePioneer Era inductee in 2003

 Wrestling Observer NewsletterWrestling Observer Newsletter Hall of Fame (Class of 2002)

 WWEWWE Hall of Fame (Class of 2017)

 Other titles'''
 American Heavyweight Championship (1 time)
 World Light Heavyweight Championship (2 times)

Nicknames
 Farmer
 The Grandmaster of American Wrestling

References

External links
 
 Wrestling Museum
 Martin "Farmer" Burns
 The "Farmer" Burns workout

1861 births
1937 deaths
American catch wrestlers
American male professional wrestlers
People associated with physical culture
People from Cedar County, Iowa
Professional wrestlers from Iowa
Professional Wrestling Hall of Fame and Museum
19th-century professional wrestlers
WWE Hall of Fame Legacy inductees